Éric Kayser (born 16 October 1964 in Lure, Haute-Saône) is a French baker and food writer.

Early years 
Kayser's great-grandfather, grandfather, and father were all traditional French bakers in Lorraine. In 1975, when he was 11, his parents moved to the Côte d’Azur. He did his apprenticeship at Fréjus. In 1983, aged 19 Kayser became a Compagnon. He quickly realized his call for baking at a young age and decided to pursue his passion. At the age of 18, he became a companion of the prestigious Tour de France of baking. In 1994, together with fellow companion Patrick Castagna, Kayser invented the Fermento Levain. This piece of equipment allows for the continuous use of liquid levain, a breakthrough in the field.

Maison Kayser 

On September 13, 1996, Kayser opened his first bakery at 8 rue Monge in Paris. It was an instant success, garnering much critical acclaim. The opening of many more bakeries in Paris and in various countries abroad followed very quickly. Today, there are over 200 Maison Kayser locations worldwide. With 28 in Paris alone, more locations have opened throughout Tunisia, Greece, Portugal, Russia, Japan, Ukraine, United Kingdom, Cambodia, Morocco, Senegal, Ivory Coast, South Korea, Lebanon, the UAE, Chile, Indonesia, Singapore, Colombia Mexico, the US, Hong Kong, Taiwan, the Philippines, Nigeria, and Israel. The products and services in the bakeries vary from country to country, each adapting to the local tastes and flavors. This dynamic touch has helped the growth of Maison Kayser throughout the world. Due to the COVID-19 pandemic Maison Kayser USA filed for bankruptcy.

Books
 Les tartes d'Éric Kayser 2006 
 Mes recettes: Céréales, graines et fruits secs Éric Kayser - 2008
 Mes petits biscuits sucrés et salés Éric Kayser, Yaïr Yosefi
 The Larousse Book of Bread: 80 Recipes to Make at Home - Éric Kayser - 2014

References

External links 
 Maison Kayser

1964 births
Living people
Bakers